Yallakool is an unbounded village community within the locality of Caldwell in the central south part of the Riverina in New South Wales, Australia.

Yallakool Post Office opened on 17 August 1927 and closed in 1965.

References

Towns in the Riverina
Murray River Council